The Sixteenth Oklahoma Legislature was a meeting of the legislative branch of the government of Oklahoma, composed of the Oklahoma Senate and the Oklahoma House of Representatives. The state legislature met November 24, 1936, to May 11, 1937, during the term of Governor E.W. Marland.

The Democratic Party dominated both chambers. There were no Republican state senators in 1937 and only three state representatives. As Lieutenant Governor of Oklahoma, James E. Berry served as the President of the Senate. Allen G. Nichols served as President pro tempore of the Oklahoma Senate and J. T. Daniel served as the Speaker of the Oklahoma House of Representatives.

Dates of session
Special session: November 24, 1936 – January 4, 1937
Regular session: January 4-May 11, 1937
Previous: 15th Legislature • Next: 17th Legislature

Party composition

Senate

House of Representatives

Leadership

Senate
There were no Republicans in the state senate in 1937. As Lieutenant Governor of Oklahoma, James E. Berry served as the President of the Senate, giving him a tie-breaking vote and the authority to serve as the presiding officer. Allen G. Nichols served as President pro tempore of the Oklahoma Senate, the chamber's chief leader and organizer.

House of Representatives
The Oklahoma Democratic Party held 114 of the 117 seats in the Oklahoma House of Representatives in 1937, allowing them to select the Speaker of the Oklahoma House of Representatives. J. T. Daniel of Waurika, Oklahoma, was elected by his fellow state representatives to serve as Speaker and J. Kenneth Hogue of Carnegie, Oklahoma, was elected to serve as Speaker Pro Tempore. James C. Nance of Purcell, Oklahoma, served as Majority Floor Leader.

Members

Senate

Table based on state almanac.

House of Representatives

Table based on government database.

References

External links
Oklahoma Legislature
Oklahoma House of Representatives
Oklahoma Senate

Oklahoma legislative sessions
1937 in Oklahoma
1938 in Oklahoma
1937 U.S. legislative sessions
1938 U.S. legislative sessions